This article contains a list with gratis (but not necessarily open source) satellite navigation (or "GPS") software for a range of devices (PC, laptop, tablet PC, mobile phone, handheld PC (Pocket PC, Palm)). Some of the free software mentioned here does not have detailed maps (or maps at all) or the ability to follow streets or type in street names (no geocoding). However, in many cases, it is also that which makes the program free (and sometimes open source), avoid the need of an Internet connection, and make it very lightweight (allowing use on small portable devices, including smartphones). Very basic programs like this may not be suitable for road navigation in cars, but serve their purpose for navigation while walking or trekking, and for use at sea. To determine the GPS coordinates of a destination, one can use sites such as GPScoordinates.eu and GPS visualizer.

Some software presented here is free, but maps may need to be paid for. In this instance, and in the instance that some maps (of specific countries) are not standardly available, Mobile Atlas Creator (MOBAC) can be used (e.g. on OruxMaps, Maverick, Sports Tracker, Maplorer).

Some of the software mentioned can also be run on different devices than what they are intended for. A particular case-in-point is the Android software which can often be run on laptops or PCs (running Linux, Windows or Mac OS X) as well. This can be done using emulators.

Some of the software mentioned here may run only on devices that are no longer commercially sold (such as the PalmPilot and PocketPC devices). However, these devices are often still obtainable via second-hand websites.

Navigation software

Free maps 
Navigation software with free maps often uses maps from the OpenStreetMap project.

Non-free maps

Other satellite navigation software

Miscellaneous / unsorted software

See also
Comparison of satellite navigation software
Comparison of web map services

References

Satellite navigation
Global Positioning System
GPS software